Disiamylborane (bis(1,2-dimethylpropyl)borane, Sia2BH) is an organoborane used in organic synthesis. It is used for hydroboration–oxidation reactions of terminal alkynes, giving aldehydes via anti-Markovnikov hydration followed by tautomerization. Disiamylborane is relatively selective for terminal alkynes and alkenes vs internal alkynes and alkenes. Disiamylborane is prepared by hydroboration of trimethylethylene with diborane. The reaction stops at the secondary borane due to steric hindrance.

Related reagents
9-Borabicyclo[3.3.1]nonane (9-BBN). 
 Thexylborane ((1,1,2-trimethylpropyl)borane, ThxBH2), a primary borane obtained by hydroboration of tetramethylethylene.

Naming 
The name siamyl is an abbreviation for "sec-isoamyl".

References

Alkylboranes
Reagents for organic chemistry